Cucurbita scabridifolia is a plant species of the genus Cucurbita native to Mexico. It is a xerophyte and has not been domesticated. Very little is known about this species. Geographic location and genetics make it highly likely that C. scabridifolia  is a naturally occurring hybrid of C. foetidissima and C. pedatifolia.

The species was formally described by Liberty Hyde Bailey in 1943, in Gentes Herbarum.

References

External links

Squashes and pumpkins
Flora of Mexico
Plants described in 1943
scabridifolia